Fundy–The Isles–Saint John West is a provincial electoral district for the Legislative Assembly of New Brunswick, Canada.

History
It was created as Charlotte-The Isles in 2006 as a result of a merger of the old district of Charlotte with the district of Fundy Isles less Campobello Island which moved from Fundy Isles to the new Charlotte-Campobello district. The largest community within this riding is the town of St. George.

Andrea Anderson-Mason, is the current member of the Legislative Assembly. A former family court lawyer, she is also the Attorney General for the province. She was elected in 2018.

Under the recommendations of a 2012 Electoral Boundaries and Representation Commission, the boundaries of district where adjusted and accepted by the Provincial Government. While the district lost polls from its western boundary, it gained area in the east with the addition of polls in St. John County.  The commission did not recommend a name change, but the electoral boundaries commission changed its name from Charlotte-The Isles to Fundy-The Isles-Saint John West.

Currently, Michael O'Neill is the Liberal President of the riding, Andrea Anderson-Mason is the Progressive Conservative President of the riding and Teresa "Terry" James is the riding President for New Brunswick NDP.

Members of the Legislative Assembly

Election results

Fundy-The Isles-Saint John West

Charlotte-The Isles

References

External links 
Website of the Legislative Assembly of New Brunswick
Fundy-The Isles-Saint John West Provincial Liberal Riding Association
Map of riding as of 2018

New Brunswick provincial electoral districts